is the 27th single by the Japanese J-pop group Every Little Thing, released on February 25, 2004.

Track listing
  (Words - Kaori Mochida / music - HIKARI)
 Stray cat (20031223 version) (Words - Kaori Mochida / music - Kazuhiro Hara)
  (instrumental)

Chart positions

External links
  information at Avex Network.
  information at Oricon.

2004 singles
Every Little Thing (band) songs
Songs written by Kaori Mochida
2004 songs
Avex Trax singles